Serine/threonine-protein kinase SIK2 is an enzyme that in humans is encoded by the SIK2 gene.

Interactions 

SNF1LK2 has been shown to interact with CRTC2.

References

Further reading 

 
 
 
 
 
 
 
 
 

EC 2.7.11